General elections were held in Bermuda on 7 June 1972. The ruling United Bermuda Party remained in power, again winning 30 of the 40 seats in the House of Assembly.

Results

References

Bermuda
1972 in Bermuda
Elections in Bermuda
Election and referendum articles with incomplete results